Goshen is an unincorporated community in Lexington Township, Scott County, in the U.S. state of Indiana.

History
The community was named after the Land of Goshen.

Geography

References

Unincorporated communities in Scott County, Indiana
Unincorporated communities in Indiana